DXBR (981 AM) Bombo Radyo is a radio station owned and operated by Bombo Radyo Philippines through its licensee People's Broadcasting Service. Its studio, offices and transmitter are located at Bombo Radyo Broadcast Center, P-6 Barangay Ampayon, Butuan.

References

Radio stations in Butuan
News and talk radio stations in the Philippines
Radio stations established in 1994